La Corde du pendu et autres histoires (lit.: The Hangman's Rope and Other Stories) is a Lucky Luke adventure written by Goscinny with Morris and illustrated by Morris. It was originally published in French in the year 1982. The album contains seven short stories.

The name recalls La Corde du Pendu (1870), the last and incomplete novel featuring Rocambole.

Stories

La Corde du pendu ("The Hangman's Rope") 
In a small town, a rope seller named Ropey regularly instigates the local mob into hanging every culprit for even the smallest of offenses - a practice Lucky Luke decides to put to an end to.

Les Dalton prennent le train ("The Daltons Take the Train") 
The Daltons escape again and decide to rob trains, only to be hindered by more bandit competition and, in the end, Lucky Luke.

Le Justicier ("The Justiciary") 
Lucky Luke arrives at Coyote Gulch and meets Zozzo, a clumsy vigilante who is not able to bring justice. After failing to train him, Luke then disguises himself as Zozzo and walks around the town to scare passing troublemakers, which helps Zozzo gain a reputation as a great hero.

La Mine du chameau ("The Camel Mine") 
Lucky Luke meets Hadji Ali, a Muslim who tries to prove the worth of his camels and becomes a legend in Arizona after having come across a gold mine but willingly relinquishing it to the locals. This story is inspired by a real, failed attempt by the American army to use camels for convoys crossing the American deserts.

Règlement de comptes ("Gunfight") 
Lucky Luke re-encounters saloon dancer Laura Legs (from Le Grand Duc). This makes the son of a rich rancher, who has a crush on Laura, jealous and compels him to duel the cowboy. However, he eventually finds his true match with the blacksmith's daughter, who is genuinely in love with him.

La Bonne parole ("The Good Word") 
Absestos Misbeliever, a dedicated but stubborn preacher, travels to the territory of the Apaches to bring them the word of God to them. With his incautious approach, Lucky Luke finds himself compelled to act as the preacher's escort.

Li-Chi's Story 
This story describes the rise of Li-Chi, a Chinese acquaintance of Lucky Luke's, from becoming sheriff in a Chinese immigrant town to an unsuccessful candidate for US presidency.

External links
Lucky Luke official site album index 
Goscinny website on Lucky Luke

Comics by Morris (cartoonist)
Lucky Luke albums
1982 graphic novels
Works by René Goscinny